Costoma is a moth genus of the family Depressariidae.

Species
 Costoma basirosella Busck, 1914
 Costoma cirrophaea (Meyrick, 1924)

References

Depressariinae
Moth genera